Per amare Ofelia (internationally released as To Love Ophelia) is a 1974 Italian comedy film directed by Flavio Mogherini.

It is the debut film of Renato Pozzetto, and for his performance he won a Silver Ribbon for Best New Actor.

Plot  
Young advertising, no father, is locked in relations with the girls for the attraction he feels for the beautiful and still young mother. A former prostitute in love with him will solve the problem.

Cast 
Giovanna Ralli: Ofelia
Renato Pozzetto: Orlando
Françoise Fabian: Federica
Maurizio Arena: Spartaco
Didi Perego: Nun
Alberto de Mendoza: Lawyer
Orchidea De Santis: Prostitute
Rossana Di Lorenzo: Iris
George Rigaud: Nane

See also   
 List of Italian films of 1974

References

External links

1974 films
Italian comedy films
1974 comedy films
Films directed by Flavio Mogherini
Films about prostitution in Italy
Films about businesspeople
Films about virginity
Films scored by Riz Ortolani
1970s Italian-language films
1970s Italian films